Abu'l-Muzaffar Khusrau Malik ibn Khusrau-Shah, better simply known as Khusrau Malik (also spelled Khosrow), was the last Sultan of the Ghaznavid Empire, ruling from 1160 to 1186. He was the son and successor of Khusrau Shah (r. 1157–1160).

Reign

In 1161/2, the Ghurids seized the Ghaznavid capital of Ghazni, forcing Khusrau Malik to retreat to Lahore, which became his new capital. From there he made incursions into northern India, expanding his rule as far as southern Kashmir. He also created an alliance with the Indian Khokhar tribe. In 1170, Khusrau (or one of his commanders) invaded the southern part of the Ganges.

In 1178 the Ghurid ruler Mu'izz al-Din Muhammad invaded the southern part of Ghaznavid Punjab and reached as far as Gujarat. In 1179/80 he seized Peshawar, and by 1181/2 swept around Lahore, but Khusrau Malik managed to keep him from the city by paying him so he retreated from Lahore instead of laying siege to the city. However, Lahore was finally captured by the Ghurids in 1186, while Khusrau-Malik and his son Bahram-Shah were taken to Ghur and imprisoned, marking the end of the Ghaznavid Empire. Both were executed in 1191.

Sources
 
 
 
 
 

Ghaznavid rulers
12th-century deaths
12th-century births